Disco Marching Kraft is an EP by Earthlings? released in 2003 through Crippled Dick Hot Wax.

Track listing
"Disco Marching Kraft" (Dave Catching, Schneeberger, Pete Stahl) – 4:08
"Waterhead" (Schneeberger, Stahl) – 4:13
"Gentle Grace" (Schneeberger, Serum, Stahl) – 4:46
"Family Ford" (Catching, Maples, Mcguire, Schneeberger, Stahl) - 4:06

Personnel
Dave Catching - guitar
Pete Stahl - vocals
Molly McGuire - bass, vocals
Adam Maples - drums, vocals
Gene Trautmann - drums on "Gentle Grace"
Joshua Homme - bass on "Disco Marching Kraft"

Earthlings? albums
2003 EPs